Stephen Charles Kerr (born 26 September 1960) is a Scottish politician serving as convener of the Education, Children and Young People Committee since 2021. A member of the Scottish Conservatives, he has been a Member of the Scottish Parliament (MSP) for the Central Scotland region since 2021. He was previously Member of Parliament (MP) for Stirling from 2017 to 2019.

Kerr attended the University of Stirling and worked for Kimberly Clark before his election to Parliament. He was the Conservative candidate in Stirling in 2005 and 2015 but was defeated by Labour and the SNP, respectively. He eventually gained the seat in 2017 with a narrow majority over Steven Paterson. However, he was defeated by Alyn Smith in 2019.

Listed number one on the Scottish Conservative Central Scotland regional list, Kerr was elected at the 2021 Scottish Parliament election.

Early life and career 
Kerr was born in Dundee and raised on a council estate in Forfar, Angus. He attended a local primary school and later, Forfar Academy, before leaving at 16 to work as a bank junior. He graduated from the University of Stirling with an honours degree in business. Kerr's career has largely been spent working in business, mainly in sales and marketing. His role immediately prior to his election involved heading the sales teams for Kimberly Clark in the UK, Ireland and France.

Member of Parliament for Stirling 
Kerr was the Conservative Party candidate in Stirling at both the 2005 and 2015 general elections; where he lost to Labour the first time, and the SNP the second time before he eventually gained the seat in 2017 with a narrow majority of 148 votes (0.3%) over Steven Paterson of the SNP. 

Kerr signed a letter to the Prime Minister on 16 February 2018, making suggestions about the way Britain should leave the European Union.

Kerr founded the APPG for Professional Sales as Chairman, in June 2018. It published a report into the sales capabilities of SMEs in October 2019, making 24 recommendations on how to help SMEs to improve their sales capabilities. The launch event was keynoted by Kelly Tolhurst, Small Businesses Minister.

In July 2018, Kerr unveiled replicas of the John Allan Stones at the Stirling Smith Art Gallery and Museum. The stones were originally placed on Albany Crescent, a now-demolished row of houses near the Stirling City Centre. Although the original stones were taken to the United States by David O. McKay, who had seen them while serving as a Mormon missionary, following the houses being knocked down, they remained a part of Stirling's history through their association with Stirling architect John Allan. The motto "What e're thou art, act well thy part" inscribed on the stones inspired McKay to continue his work as a missionary, and as such became known across the Church for their inspiring qualities. The originals can still be found in the church's Missionary Training Center in Provo, Utah. The replica stones were carved by Doune Stonemasons James Innes and Son.

Kerr was defeated by the SNP's Alyn Smith in the 2019 general election. Smith won the seat from Kerr with a majority of 9,254 votes (17.6%).

Member of the Scottish Parliament for Central Scotland 
Kerr topped the Scottish Conservative list for Central Scotland in the 2021 Scottish Parliament election. He was elected alongside Graham Simpson and Meghan Gallacher. He took his seat on 10 May 2021. Upon his election, he was given the role of Chief Whip for the Scottish Conservatives in Holyrood, replacing Miles Briggs.

On the 28 May, Kerr used his maiden speech to urge the Cabinet Secretary for Health, Humza Yousaf, to speed up rollout of the COVID-19 vaccine. He was later elected as convenor of the Education, Skills and Young People committee on 23 June.

On 12 January 2022, Kerr called for Boris Johnson to resign as Conservative party leader and Prime Minister over the Westminster lockdown parties controversy along with a majority of Scottish Conservative MSPs.

In a mini-reshuffle in September 2022, Kerr was moved to be the Shadow Secretary for Education and Skills, shadowing Shirley-Anne Somerville. He was replaced as Scottish Conservative Chief Whip by Alexander Burnett.

Personal life 
Kerr has lived in the Stirling area since 1982. He and his wife, Yvonne, were married in 1983 and they are the parents of four children. They have lived in Bridge of Allan since the 1980s. He is a member of The Church of Jesus Christ of Latter-day Saints and has served in a number of positions in the church, including as a missionary in London during his youth and an area seventy from 2006 to 2013. Among other assignments while an area seventy, Kerr was president of the Church's first pageant held in Britain.

References

External links 
 
 

1960 births
Living people
People educated at Forfar Academy
Alumni of the University of Stirling
Politicians from Dundee
Scottish Latter Day Saints
Scottish Conservative Party MPs
UK MPs 2017–2019
Members of the Scottish Parliament 2021–2026
Conservative MSPs